A businessman,  or businessperson, is a business professional.

Businessman or Business Man may also refer to: 

 Businessman (film), a film by Puri Jagannadh
 Businessman (soundtrack), a soundtrack album from the film
 "Business Man", a 2009 song by Crookers
 "Business Man", a song by Dizzee Rascal from the 2017 album Raskit
 "Business Man", a song by Tom Cardy from the 2021 EP Artificial Intelligence

See also
 The Business Man (disambiguation)